Bishop Ward High School is a private, coed, Roman Catholic high school in Kansas City, Kansas, United States.  It is part of the Roman Catholic Archdiocese of Kansas City in Kansas.

History
Bishop Ward High School was established in 1908 as Catholic High School at 1236 Sandusky, Kansas City, Kansas. In 1931, during the Great Depression, the current building was built at 708 North 18th Street, Kansas City, Kansas, and the school was renamed Bishop Ward High School. It is named after Bishop John Ward.

Currently Bishop Ward is a Catholic college preparatory high school.

Athletics
Bishop Ward High School has a long history of success in athletics especially on the baseball diamond. The boys' baseball team has claimed 12 state titles, six of which came consecutively from 2003 to 2008.  The football team won two state titles in 1971 and 1973.  The boys' basketball team won a state title in 1938.

Bishop Ward’s Football Team is led under head coach Greg Duggins.

Notable alumni
 Neil Allen, pitching coach for Minnesota Twins; former MLB player (New York Mets, Saint Louis Cardinals, New York Yankees, Chicago White Sox, Cleveland Indians)
 Ed Dwight, African-American sculptor and Astronaut candidate. First African American test pilot to enter the Air Force training program from which NASA selected astronauts.
 Ray Sadecki, former MLB player (St. Louis Cardinals, San Francisco Giants, New York Mets, Atlanta Braves, Kansas City Royals, Milwaukee Brewers)
 David Segui, former MLB player (Baltimore Orioles, New York Mets, Montreal Expos, Seattle Mariners, Toronto Blue Jays, Texas Rangers, Cleveland Indians)
 Diego Segui, former MLB player (Kansas City Athletics, Washington Senators, Seattle Pilots, St. Louis Cardinals, Boston Red Sox)

See also
 List of high schools in Kansas

References

External links
 

Roman Catholic Archdiocese of Kansas City in Kansas
Catholic secondary schools in Kansas
Buildings and structures in Kansas City, Kansas
Educational institutions established in 1908
Schools in Wyandotte County, Kansas
Education in Kansas City, Kansas
1908 establishments in Kansas